Hampton may refer to:

Places

Australia
Hampton bioregion, an IBRA biogeographic region in Western Australia
Hampton, New South Wales
Hampton, Queensland, a town in the Toowoomba Region
Hampton, Victoria

Canada
Hampton, New Brunswick
Hampton Parish, New Brunswick
Hampton, Nova Scotia
Hampton, Ontario
Hampton, Prince Edward Island

United Kingdom
Hampton, Cheshire, former civil parish
Hampton, Herne Bay, Kent
Hampton-on-Sea, Herne Bay, Kent (drowned settlement at the above location)
Hampton, London, London Borough of Richmond upon Thames
Hampton, Peterborough in Cambridgeshire
Hampton Loade, Shropshire
Hampton Lucy, Warwickshire
Hampton, Worcestershire
Hampton in Arden in Solihull, West Midlands
Hampton-on-the-Hill, Warwickshire

United States
Hampton, Arkansas
Hampton, Connecticut
Hampton, Florida
Hampton, Georgia
Hampton, Illinois
Hampton, Iowa
Hampton, Kentucky
Hampton, Maryland
Hampton, Minnesota
Hampton, Missouri
Hampton, Nebraska
Hampton, New Hampshire, a New England town
Hampton (CDP), New Hampshire, the central village in the town
Hampton, New Jersey 
Hampton, New York, in Washington County
The Hamptons, New York, on Long Island
East Hampton, New York
East Hampton (town)
East Hampton (village)
East Hampton Village District
Southampton, New York
Southampton (village)
Westhampton, New York
Hampton, Deschutes County, Oregon
Hampton, Lane County, Oregon
Hampton, Pennsylvania
Hampton, South Carolina
Hampton, Tennessee
Hampton, Texas
Hampton, Virginia
Hampton, West Virginia
Collinston, Utah, formerly known as Hampton
Hampton Double Square Historic District, listed on the National Register of Historic Places in Franklin County, Iowa

People
Hampton (surname)
Hampton W. Wall (1831–1898), American businessman and politician

Schools
Hampton School, London Borough of Richmond upon Thames
Hampton University, Virginia
Hampton Pirates and Lady Pirates, athletic teams representing the University

Other uses
Hampton (car), a British automobile produced from 1912 to 1933
Hampton (horse), a British Thoroughbred racehorse
Hampton by Hilton, a hotel chain
Hampton National Historic Site, Towson, Maryland
, various United States Navy ships
Hampton One-Design, a class of sailing dinghy

See also
The Hamptons (disambiguation)

Hampden (disambiguation)